Mishal Raheja is an Indian television actor. He made his debut with the MTV show Pyar Vyar and All That and is known for portraying the role of Dutta Bhau in Laagi Tujhse Lagan, Akash Sehgal in Love Story and Viplav Tripathi in TV series Ishq Ka Rang Safed. He also essayed the character of King Singh in the Zee TV daily soap opera Kumkum Bhagya. In September 2022, He joined Aam Aadmi Party in Mumbai.

Filmography

Television

Web series

Special appearance

Awards and nominations

The Indian Television Academy Awards
Nominated
 2010 - ITA Best Actor Popular Award for Laagi Tujhse Lagan

BIG Star Entertainment Awards
Nominated
 2010 - BIG Star Television Actor (Male) Award for Laagi Tujhse Lagan

References

External links

Living people
Indian male film actors
Indian male television actors
1982 births